D. H. Morgan Manufacturing, later simply known as Morgan, was a manufacturer of roller coaster trains, custom amusement rides, roller coasters, children's rides and other amusement devices. Founded in 1983, the company was originally headquartered in Scotts Valley, California. In 1991, the company moved to La Selva Beach, California, and into a new 55,000-square-foot indoor manufacturing facility. That facility was later increased to 75,000 square feet. The company produced a variety of rides from 1983 until 2001, but is probably best known for its steel hyper coasters.

History
Dana Morgan, the son of Arrow Development co-founder Ed Morgan, founded D. H. Morgan Manufacturing in 1983. He got his start in the amusement industry at age 14 as a ride operator at Playtown, a small children's park in Palo Alto, California, that was owned by Arrow Development. Upon graduation from Cal Poly San Luis Obispo he went to work for Disney, primarily doing design work for the Walt Disney World project. During the construction of Disney World, Morgan went to work for Arrow Development which was building rides for Disney World. In 1974 Morgan left Arrow Development to become the general manager of the Santa Cruz Beach Boardwalk. When Huss Maschinenfabrik purchased Arrow Development in 1981, Morgan was appointed president of the newly formed Arrow-Huss. Morgan left Arrow-Huss in 1983 to form his own company, D. H. Morgan Manufacturing. Morgan had originally intended to build carousels, but the company's first contract was to build new trains for the Giant Dipper wooden roller coaster at the Santa Cruz Beach Boardwalk. The demand for new coaster vehicles was so great that the carousel-building business had to be put on hold until 1988. In the meantime, the Electric Antique Car Line was developed, and customer requests came in for custom attractions as well. In March 1991, the company moved to larger facilities in La Selva Beach, California. Dana Morgan continued building trains for wooden coasters until 1994 when on June 8, he sold the wood train manufacturing operation to competitor Philadelphia Toboggan Coasters. The last Morgan trains built for a wooden coaster were delivered to Yomiuriland in Japan.

In 1995 Morgan built a Mine Train type ride for Michael Bonfante for what was then called Hecker Pass — A Family Adventure in Gilroy, California. The coaster, Quicksilver Express, was manufactured in 1995 but sat at the Morgan Manufacturing facility for five years before it was finally installed in 2000. Bonfante Gardens opened to the public a year later in 2001. In 1995, Richard Kinzel of Cedar Fair asked Morgan to build a 200-foot hypercoaster for Valleyfair in Minnesota. Utilizing designer Steve Okamoto, whom he had worked with at Arrow Dynamics, Morgan opened Wild Thing in 1996. Morgan went on to build seven more steel coasters, including two more for Cedar Fair. D. H. Morgan Manufacturing also redesigned the former Arrow Coaster Steel Phantom at Kennywood Park in Pennsylvania.

Dana Morgan retired from the amusement industry in 2001 and sold the assets of his company on June 14, 2001 to Michael Chance, who was the sales representative for competitor Chance Industries, Inc.

List of roller coasters

As of 2019, D.H. Morgan Manufacturing has built 9 roller coasters around the world.

Wooden roller coaster trains

Steel roller coasters trains

Carousels

Electric guide-limited auto rides
Morgan produced two styles of cars: Classic Antique cars with two or four-passenger vehicles, and 1950s-themed cars with a working radio that played classic 1950s tunes.

Miscellaneous projects

References

Amusement ride manufacturers
American companies established in 1983
American companies disestablished in 2001
Roller coaster manufacturers
Manufacturing companies based in California
1983 establishments in California
2001 disestablishments in California